The Syntrophobacteraceae are a family of Thermodesulfobacteriota.

References

Thermodesulfobacteriota
Bacteria families